Zeynep Tokuş (born 1977) is a Turkish actress and former beauty pageant winner. In 2007, she won the title of the TV show Turkish version of Dancing on Ice.

Biography
Tokuş was educated in graphic design at the Bilkent University in Ankara.

In 1998, she became the winner of the beauty contest of the newspaper Star, and received thereupon a role in the movie Deli Yürek.

In 2001, Tokuş was awarded the "Best Actress" for her role in the movie Yazgı.

On 11 March 2007, she won the title and a prize of TRY 100,000 in the Show TV show Buzda Dans (Dancing on Ice), after competing ten weeks. Her partner was the American figure skater Robert Beauchamp, a former Holiday On Ice performer.

Zeynep Tokuş gave birth to her son Alp on 5 December 2001 in Canada.

Filmography
Movies
 Vizontele – as Asiye (2000)
 Yazgı (2001)
 Vizontele Tuuba – as Asiye (2004)
 Doom of Love – as yoga instructor (2022)

TV series
 Deli Yürek –  as Zeynep (1999)
 Kerem – as Sevil (1999)
 Çocuklar Duymasın – as Meltem (2002)
 Esir Şehrin İnsanları – as Nedime (2003)
 Bedel (2003)
 Hırçın Menekşe – as Deniz (2003)
 Çocuklar Ne Olacak (2004)

Notes

External links
 

1977 births
People from Ankara
Bilkent University alumni
Turkish film actresses
Turkish television presenters
Living people
Turkish television actresses
Turkish women television presenters